Sahlah (also Romanized as Sahleh; also known as Saglya and Sahila) is a village in Mojezat Rural District, in the Central District of Zanjan County, Zanjan Province, Iran. At the 2006 census, its population was 917, in 213 families.

References 

Populated places in Zanjan County